Jaʻfarabad (also Romanized as Ja‘farābād) is a village in Sanjabi Rural District, Kuzaran District, Kermanshah County, Kermanshah Province, Iran. At the 2006 census, its population was 139, in 32 families.

References 

Populated places in Kermanshah County